SYCAMOUR is a post-hardcore band from Ypsilanti, Michigan that was formed in 2010.  They were previously signed to Hopeless Records and have released three albums.

Members

Current 
 Jeremy Gilmore - Clean Vocals
 Jake Harris - Guitar
 Tony Sugent - Unclean Vocals
 Victor Yousof - Drums
 Blake Howard - Guitar

Former 
 Zack Ferrell - Guitar
 Charles McCormick - Bass

Discography

Albums

Singles

Guest Appearances 
Indulgence: A Saga of Lights - Doubt (feat Phil Druyor)

Indulgence: A Saga of Lights - Composure (feat Trent Woodley)

Dreaming Awake - Friction (feat Jeremy Gilmore)

References

American post-hardcore musical groups
Punk rock groups from Michigan
Musical groups established in 2010
Ypsilanti, Michigan
2010 establishments in Michigan